Diego de Pantoja or Diego Pantoja (Chinese: 龐迪我, Pang Diwo; April 1571, Valdemoro, Spain – January 1618, Portuguese Macau, China) was a Spanish Jesuit and missionary to China who is best known for having accompanied Matteo Ricci in Beijing. His name also appears in some sources as Didaco Pantoia.

Biography 
He arrived in Portuguese Macau on 20 July 1597, where he received his final instructions for his work in China at St. Paul's College. He was then sent to the Ming dynasty's southern capital, Nanjing, where he stayed from March 1600. He worked with Matteo Ricci, who later completed his work on the Zhifang waiji, China's first global atlas. Together, they left Nanjing on 19 May 1600, and arrived at the Ming dynasty's Northern and overall capital, Beijing, on  24 January 1601.

He worked in Beijing for many years, including as a musician, astronomer (with calendar corrections) and as a geographer (working with latitude).

On 18 March 1617 he was tried as an enemy of the Chinese astronomers and was expelled from China, along with his colleague Sabatino de Ursis, and settled in Macao, where he lived for the short time remaining before his death.

References

Literature
Ignacio Ramos Riera: Diego de Pantoja. Dalla Spagna alla Cina: La Civiltà Cattolica 4067/4 (2019), 484–492. ISSN 0009-8167 
L. Carrington Goodrich & Chao-Ying Fang (ed.): Dictionary of Ming Biography, 2 ed., New York/London: Columbia University Press 1976 
Gianni Criveller: Preaching Christ in Late Ming China: The Jesuits' Presentation of Christ from Matteo Ricci to Giulio Aleni, Taipei:Taipei Ricci Institute 1997 
 Trigault, Nicolas S. J. "China in the Sixteenth Century: The Journals of Mathew Ricci: 1583-1610". English  translation by  Louis J. Gallagher, S.J. (New York: Random House, Inc. 1953). This is an English translation of the Latin work,  De Christiana expeditione apud Sinas based on Matteo Ricci's journals completed by Nicolas Trigault. Ricci and Pantoja's trip to Beijing is described on pp. 354–399.   There is also  full Latin text available on Google Books.

See also
Jesuit China missions

1571 births
1618 deaths
People from Valdemoro
Spanish cartographers
Jesuit scientists
17th-century Spanish astronomers
Spanish musicians
17th-century geographers
16th-century Spanish Jesuits
17th-century Spanish Jesuits
17th-century cartographers
Spanish Roman Catholic missionaries
Spanish expatriates in China
Jesuit missionaries in China